A forest is a large area covered by trees.

Forest may also refer to:

Businesses and organisations
 FOREST ("Freedom Organisation for the Right to Enjoy Smoking Tobacco"), a British smokers' rights organisation
 Forest Institute, a private American university
 Forest Laboratories, an American pharmaceutical company
 Forest School (disambiguation)

Computing
Forest (application), a productivity app
 Forest (data structure), a set of zero or more disjoint tree data structures
 Forest, a collection structure in Active Directory

Film and television
 Forest (1980 film) (Russian: Лес), a Soviet comedy film
 Forest (2003 film), a Bulgarian film
 Forest (TV series), a 2020 South Korean drama

Music
 Forest (band), a 1960s UK psych-folk band
 Forest (George Winston album), 1994
 Forest (Lee Seung-gi EP), 2012
 Forest (Seirom EP), 2011
 Forest, a 2004 album by Circle
 "A Forest", a 1980 song by The Cure
 "Forest", a song by System of a Down on their second album Toxicity
 "Forest", a song by Twenty One Pilots from their album Regional at Best

People
 Forest (name), a list of people with the given name or surname
 f0rest, pseudonym for Patrik Lindberg (born 1988), Swedish Counter-Strike player

Places

United States
Forest, Alabama, an unincorporated community
Forest, California, an unincorporated community
Forest, Indiana, an unincorporated community
Forest, Louisiana, a village
Forest, Mississippi, a city
Forest, Ohio, a village
Forest, Texas, community in Cherokee County
Forest, Virginia, a census-designated place
Forest, Washington, an unincorporated community
Forest (community), Wisconsin, unincorporated community
Forest, Fond du Lac County, Wisconsin, a town
Forest, Richland County, Wisconsin, a town
Forest, St. Croix County, Wisconsin, a town
Forest, Vernon County, Wisconsin, a town
Forest County (disambiguation)

Elsewhere
Forest, Tasmania, Australia, a township near Smithton
Forest, Belgium, a municipality
Forest, Ontario, Canada, a community
Forest, North Yorkshire, England, a hamlet
Forest, Guernsey, a parish
Forest (Mbeya ward), Tanzania, an administrative ward

Sports
Nottingham Forest F.C., a football club based in Nottingham, England 
Wanderers F.C. or Forest F.C., a pioneer football team

Other uses
 Forest (graph theory), an undirected graph all of whose connected components are trees
 Forest (name), a given name and surname
 Forest (novel), a 2001 novel by Australian author Sonya Hartnett
 Forest (painting), an oil painting by Paul Cézanne
 Forest Café, a community café and arts venue in central Edinburgh
 Forest Theater, a theater in Carmel-by-the-Sea, California
 New Forest coven, an alleged group of witches
 Royal forest, a hunting reserve for exclusive royal use

See also
 The Forest (disambiguation)
 Forest City (disambiguation)
 Forest District (disambiguation)
 Forest Hill (disambiguation)
 Forest Hills (disambiguation)
 Forest Lake (disambiguation)
 Forest Park (disambiguation)
 Forest Preserve (disambiguation)
 Forest River (disambiguation)
 Forest Township (disambiguation)
 Forester (disambiguation)
 Forestville (disambiguation)
 Forrest (disambiguation)
 Lake Forest (disambiguation)